BIIE-0246 is a drug used in scientific research which acts as a potent and selective antagonist for the Neuropeptide Y receptor Y2. It was one of the first non-peptide Y2-selective antagonists developed, and remains among the most widely used tools for studying this receptor. It has been used to demonstrate a role for the Y2 subtype as a presynaptic autoreceptor limiting further neuropeptide Y release, as well as modulating dopamine and acetylcholine release. It has also been shown to produce several behavioural effects in animals, including reducing alcohol consumption in addicted rats and anxiolytic effects, although while selective Y2 agonists are expected to be useful as anorectics, BIIE-0246 did not appear to increase appetite when administered alone.

References 

Neuropeptide Y antagonists
Cyclopentanes